The Norway Debate, sometimes called the Narvik Debate, was a momentous debate in the British House of Commons from 7 to 9 May 1940, during the Second World War. The official title of the debate, as held in the Hansard parliamentary archive, is Conduct of the War. Scheduled in advance, it was initiated by an adjournment motion enabling the Commons to freely discuss the progress of the Norwegian Campaign. The debate quickly brought to a head widespread dissatisfaction with the overall conduct of the war by Neville Chamberlain's government.

At the end of the second day, there was a division of the House for the members to hold a no confidence motion. The vote was won by the government but by a drastically reduced majority. That led on 10 May to Chamberlain's resignation as prime minister and the replacement of his war ministry by a broadly based coalition government, which under Winston Churchill governed the United Kingdom until after the end of the war in Europe in May 1945.

Chamberlain's government was criticised not only by the Opposition but also by respected members of his own Conservative Party. The Opposition forced the vote of no confidence, in which over a quarter of Conservative members voted with the Opposition or abstained, despite a three-line whip. There were calls for national unity to be established by formation of an all-party coalition, but it was not possible for Chamberlain to reach agreement with the opposition Labour and Liberal parties. They refused to serve under him, although they were willing to accept another Conservative as prime minister. After Chamberlain resigned as prime minister (he remained Conservative Party leader), they agreed to serve under Churchill.

Background 
In 1937, Neville Chamberlain, then Chancellor of the Exchequer, succeeded Stanley Baldwin as prime minister, leading a National Government overwhelmingly composed of Conservatives but supported by small National Labour and Liberal National parties. It was opposed by the Labour and Liberal parties. Faced with an irredentist Nazi Germany, Chamberlain attempted to avert war by a policy of appeasement, abandoned only after Germany became more overtly expansionist with the occupation of Czechoslovakia in March 1939. One of the strongest critics of both appeasement and Nazi aggression was Conservative backbencher Winston Churchill who, although he was one of the country's most prominent political figures, had last held government office in 1929. After Germany invaded Poland on 1 September 1939, the United Kingdom and France declared war on Germany. Chamberlain thereupon created a war cabinet into which he invited Churchill as First Lord of the Admiralty. It was at this point that a government supporter (possibly David Margesson, the Government Chief Whip) noted privately:

Once Germany had rapidly overrun Poland in September 1939, there was a sustained period of military inactivity for over six months that has been called the "Phoney War". On 3 April 1940, Chamberlain said in an address to the Conservative National Union that Hitler "had missed the bus". Only six days later, on 9 April, Germany launched an attack in overwhelming force on neutral and unsuspecting Norway after swiftly occupying Denmark. In response, Britain sent land and naval forces to assist the Norwegians.

Churchill, as First Lord of the Admiralty, had direct responsibility for the conduct of naval operations in the Norwegian campaign. Before the German invasion, he had pressed the Cabinet to ignore Norway's neutrality, mine its territorial waters and be prepared to seize Narvik, in both cases to disrupt the export of Swedish iron ore to Germany during winter months, when the Baltic Sea was frozen. He had, however, advised that a major landing in Norway was not realistically within Germany's powers. Apart from the naval success at Narvik, the Norwegian campaign went badly for the British forces, generally because of poor planning and organisation but essentially because military supplies were inadequate and, from 27 April, the Allies were obliged to evacuate.

When the House of Commons met on Thursday, 2 May, Labour leader Clement Attlee asked: "Is the Prime Minister now able to make a statement on the position in Norway?" Chamberlain was reluctant to discuss the military situation because of the security factors involved but did express a hope that he and Churchill would be able to say much more next week. He went on to make an interim statement of affairs but was not forthcoming about "certain operations (that) are in progress (as) we must do nothing which might jeopardise the lives of those engaged in them". He asked the House to defer comment and question until next week. Attlee agreed and so did Liberal leader Archibald Sinclair, except that he requested a debate on Norway lasting more than a single day.

Attlee then presented Chamberlain with a private notice in which he requested a schedule for next week's Commons business. Chamberlain announced that a debate on the general conduct of the war would commence on Tuesday, 7 May. The debate was keenly anticipated in both Parliament and the country. In his diary entry for Monday, 6 May, Chamberlain's Assistant Private Secretary John Colville wrote that all interest centred on the debate. Obviously, he thought, the government would win through but after facing some very awkward points about Norway. Some of Colville's colleagues including Lord Dunglass, who was Chamberlain's Parliamentary Private Secretary (PPS) at the time, considered the government position to be sound politically, but less so in other respects. Colville worried that "the confidence of the country may be somewhat shaken".

7 May: first day of the debate

Preamble and other business 
The Commons sitting on Tuesday, 7 May 1940, began at 14:45 with Speaker Edward FitzRoy in the Chair. There followed some private business matters and numerous oral answers to questions raised, many of those being about the British Army.

With these matters completed, the debate on the Norwegian Campaign began with a routine adjournment motion (i.e., "that this house do now adjourn"). Under Westminster rules, in debates like this which are held to allow for wide-ranging discussion of a variety of topics, the issue is not usually put to a vote.

At 15:48, Captain David Margesson, the Government Chief Whip, made the adjournment motion. The House proceeded to openly discuss "Conduct of the War", specifically the progress of the Norwegian Campaign, and Chamberlain rose to make his opening statement.

Chamberlain's opening speech 

Chamberlain began by reminding the House of his statement on Thursday, 2 May, five days earlier, when it was known that British forces had been withdrawn from Åndalsnes. He was now able to confirm that they had also been withdrawn from Namsos to complete the evacuation of Allied forces from central and southern Norway (the campaign in northern Norway continued). Chamberlain attempted to treat the Allied losses as unimportant and claimed that British soldiers "man for man (were) superior to their foes". He praised the "splendid gallantry and dash" of the British forces but acknowledged they were "exposed ... to superior forces with superior equipment".

Chamberlain then said he proposed "to present a picture of the situation" and to "consider certain criticisms of the government". He stated that "no doubt" the withdrawal had created a shock in both the House and the country. At this point, the interruptions began as a Labour member shouted: "All over the world".

Chamberlain sarcastically responded that "ministers, of course, must be expected to be blamed for everything". This provoked a heated reaction with several members derisively shouting: "They missed the bus!" The Speaker had to call on members not to interrupt, but they continued to repeat the phrase throughout Chamberlain's speech and he reacted with what has been described as "a rather feminine gesture of irritation". He was eventually forced to defend the original usage of the phrase directly, claiming that he would have expected a German attack on the Allies at the outbreak of war when the difference in armed power was at its greatest.

Chamberlain's speech has been widely criticised. Roy Jenkins called it "a tired, defensive speech which impressed nobody". Liberal MP Henry Morris-Jones said Chamberlain looked "a shattered man" and spoke without his customary self-assurance. When Chamberlain insisted that "the balance of advantage lay on our side", Liberal MP Dingle Foot could not believe what he was hearing and said Chamberlain was denying the fact that Britain had suffered a major defeat. The backbench Conservative MP Leo Amery said Chamberlain's speech left the House in a restive and depressed, though not yet mutinous, state of mind. Amery believed that Chamberlain was "obviously satisfied with things as they stood" and, in the government camp, the mood was actually positive as they believed they were, in John Colville's words, "going to get away with it".

Attlee's response to Chamberlain 
Clement Attlee responded as Leader of the Opposition. He quoted some of Chamberlain's and Churchill's recent confident assertions about the likely victory of the British. Ministers' statements and, even more so, the press, guided (or deliberately left uncorrected) by the government, had painted far too optimistic a picture of the Norwegian campaign. Given the level of confidence created, the setback had generated widespread disappointment. Attlee now raised the issue of government planning which would be revisited by several later speakers:

Chamberlain had announced additional powers being granted to Churchill which amounted to him having direction of the Chiefs of Staff. Attlee seized on this as an example of government incompetence, though without blaming Churchill, by saying:

Attlee struck a theme here that would recur throughout the debate – that the government was incompetent but not Churchill himself, even though he was part of it, as he had suffered from what Jenkins calls a misdirection of his talents. Jenkins remarks that Churchill's potential had not been fully utilised and, most importantly, he was clean of the stain of appeasement.

Chamberlain had been heckled during his speech for having "missed the bus" and he made his case worse by desperately trying, and failing, to excuse his use of that expression a month earlier. In doing so, he provided Attlee with an opportunity. During the conclusion of his response, Attlee said:

Attlee's closing words were a direct attack on all Conservative members, blaming them for shoring up ministers whom they knew to be failures:

Leo Amery said later that Attlee's restraint, in not calling for a division of the House (i.e., a vote), was of greater consequence than all his criticisms because, Amery believed, it made it much easier for Conservative members to be influenced by the debate's opening day.

Sinclair's response to Chamberlain 

Sir Archibald Sinclair, the leader of the Liberals, then spoke. He too was critical and began by comparing military and naval staff efficiency, which he considered proven, with political inefficiency:

He drew from Chamberlain the admission that whilst troops had been held in readiness to be sent to Norway, no troopships had been retained to send them in. Sinclair gave instances of inadequate and defective equipment and of disorganisation reported to him by servicemen returning from Norway. Chamberlain had suggested that Allied plans had failed because the Norwegians had not put up the expected resistance to the Germans. Sinclair reported that the servicemen "paid a high tribute to the courage and determination with which the Norwegians fought alongside them. They paid a particular tribute to the Norwegian ski patrols. Norwegians at Lillehammer for seven days held up with rifles only a German force with tanks, armoured cars, bombing aeroplanes and all the paraphernalia of modern war".

He concluded his speech by calling for Parliament to "speak out (and say) we must have done with half-measures (to promote) a policy for the more vigorous conduct of the war".

No longer an ordinary debate 
The rest of the first day's debate saw speeches both supporting and criticising the Chamberlain government. Sinclair was followed by two ex-soldiers, Brigadier Henry Page Croft for the Conservatives and Colonel Josiah Wedgwood for Labour. Derided by Labour, Croft made an unconvincing case in support of Chamberlain and described the press as "the biggest dictator of all".

Wedgwood denounced Croft for his "facile optimism, that saps the morale of the whole country". Wedgwood warned of the dangers inherent in trying to negotiate with Hitler and urged prosecution of the war by "a government which can take this war seriously".

Attending the debate was National Labour MP Harold Nicolson who was arguably the pre-eminent diarist of British politics in the twentieth century. He took special notice of a comment made by Wedgwood which, in Nicolson's view, transformed "an ordinary debate (into) a tremendous conflict of wills". Wedgwood had asked if the government was preparing any plan to prevent an invasion of Great Britain. A Conservative MP interrupted and asked him if he had forgotten the Royal Navy. Wedgwood countered that with:

Moments later, Admiral of the Fleet Sir Roger Keyes, the Conservative Member for Portsmouth North, arrived in the chamber and caused a stir because he was resplendent in his uniform with gold braid and six rows of medals. He squeezed into a bench just behind Nicolson who passed him a piece of paper with Wedgwood's remark scribbled on it. Keyes went to the Speaker and asked to be called next as the honour of the navy was at stake, though he had really come to the House with the intention of criticising the Chamberlain government.

Keyes: "I speak for the fighting Navy" 
When Wedgwood sat down, the Speaker called Keyes, who began by denouncing Wedgwood's comment as "a damned insult". The House, especially David Lloyd George, "roared its applause". Keyes quickly moved on and became the debate's first Tory rebel. As Jenkins puts it, Keyes "turned his guns on Chamberlain" but with the proviso that he was longing to see "proper use made of Churchill's great abilities".

Keyes was a hero of the First World War representing a naval town and an Admiral of the Fleet (though no longer on the active list). He spoke mostly on the conduct of naval operations, particularly the abortive operations to retake Trondheim. Keyes told the House:

As the House listened in silence, Keyes finished by quoting Horatio Nelson:

It was 19:30 when Keyes sat down to "thunderous applause". Nicolson wrote that Keyes' speech was the most dramatic he had ever heard, and the debate from that point on was no longer an investigation of the Norwegian Campaign but "a criticism of the government's whole war effort".

Jones and Bellenger 
The next two speakers were National Liberal Lewis Jones and Labour's Frederick Bellenger, who was still a serving army officer and was evacuated from France only a month later. Jones, who supported Chamberlain, was unimpressive and was afterwards accused of introducing party politics into the debate. There was a general exodus from the chamber as Jones was speaking. Bellenger, who repeated much of Attlee's earlier message, called "in the public interest" for a government "of a different character and a different nature".

Amery: "In the name of God, go!" 

When Bellenger sat down, it was 20:03 and the Deputy Speaker, Dennis Herbert, called on Leo Amery, who had been trying for several hours to gain the Speaker's attention. Amery later remarked that there were "barely a dozen" members present (Nicolson was among them) as he began to speak. Nicolson, who expected a powerfully critical speech from Amery, wrote that the temperature continued to rise as Amery began and his speech soon "raised it far beyond the fever point".

Amery had an ally in Clement Davies, chairman of the All Party Action Group which included some sixty MPs. Davies had been a National Liberal subject to the National Government whip but, in protest against Chamberlain, he had resigned it in December 1939 and crossed the floor of the House to rejoin the Liberals in opposition. Like many other members, Davies had gone to eat when Jones began speaking but, on hearing that Amery had been called, he rushed back to the chamber. Seeing that it was nearly empty, Davies approached Amery and urged him to deliver his full speech both to state his full case against the government and also to give Davies time to collect a large audience. Very soon, even though it was the dinner hour, the House began filling rapidly.

Amery's speech is one of the most famous in parliamentary history. As Davies had requested, he played for time until the chamber was nearly full. The most notable absentee, for much of the speech, was Chamberlain himself who was at Buckingham Palace for an audience with the King. Amery began by criticising the government's planning and execution of the Norway Campaign, especially their unpreparedness for it despite intelligence warning of likely German intervention and the clear possibility of some such response to the planned British infraction of Norwegian neutrality by the mining of Norwegian territorial waters. He gave an analogy from his own experience which illustrated the government's lack of initiative:

As tension increased in the House and Amery found himself speaking to a "crescendo of applause", Edward Spears thought he was hurling huge stones at the government glasshouse with "the effect of a series of deafening explosions". Amery widened his scope to criticise the government's whole conduct of the war to date. He moved towards his conclusion by calling for the formation of a "real" National Government in which the Trades Union Congress must be involved to "reinforce the strength of the national effort from inside".

Although sources are somewhat divided on the point, there is a consensus among them that Chamberlain had arrived back in the chamber to hear Amery's conclusion. Nicolson recorded Chamberlain as sitting on a "glum and anxious front bench". Amery said:

Amery delivered the last six words in a near whisper, pointing at Chamberlain as he did so. He sat down and the government's opponents cheered him.

Afterwards, Lloyd George told Amery that his ending was the most dramatic climax he had heard to any speech. Amery himself said he thought he had helped push the Labour Party into forcing a division next day. Harold Macmillan said later that Amery's speech "effectively destroyed the Chamberlain government".

Later speeches
It was 20:44 when Amery sat down and the debate continued until 23:30. The next speech was by Archibald Southby, who tried to defend Chamberlain. He declared that Amery's speech would "certainly give great satisfaction in Berlin" and he was shouted down. Bob Boothby interrupted and said that "it will give greater satisfaction in this country".

Southby was followed by Labour's James Milner who expressed the profound dissatisfaction with recent events of the majority of his constituents in Leeds. He called for "drastic change" to be made if Great Britain was to win the war. Edward Turnour, 6th Earl Winterton spoke next, commencing at 21:28. Although a Conservative, he began by saying that there was a great deal in Milner's speech with which he was in agreement, but almost nothing in Southby's with which he could agree.

The next speaker was Arthur Greenwood, the Labour deputy leader. He gave what Jenkins calls "a robust Labour wind-up". In his conclusion, Greenwood called for "an active, vigorous, imaginative direction of the war" which had so far been lacking as the government was passive and on the defensive because "(as) the world must know, we have never taken the initiative in this war". Summing up for the government was Oliver Stanley, the Secretary of State for War, whose reply to Greenwood has been described as ineffective.

8 May: second day and division

Morrison: "We must divide the House" 
It is generally understood that Labour did not intend a division before the debate began but Attlee, after hearing the speeches by Keyes and Amery, realised that discontent within Tory ranks was far deeper than they had thought. A meeting of the party's Parliamentary Executive was held on Wednesday morning and Attlee proposed forcing a division at the end of the debate that day. There were a handful of dissenters, including Hugh Dalton, but they were outvoted at a second meeting later on.

As a result, when Herbert Morrison reopened the debate just after 16:00, he announced that:

Jenkins says the Labour decision to divide turned the routine adjournment motion into "the equivalent of a vote of censure". Earlier in his opening address, Morrison had focused his criticism on Chamberlain, John Simon and Samuel Hoare who were the three ministers most readily associated with appeasement.

Chamberlain: "I have friends in the House" 
Hoare, the Secretary of State for Air, was scheduled to speak next but Chamberlain insisted on replying to Morrison and made an ill-judged and disastrous intervention. Chamberlain appealed not for national unity but for the support of his friends in the House:

That shocked many present who regarded it as divisive to be so explicit in relying on whipped support from his own party. Bob Boothby, a Conservative MP who was a strong critic of Chamberlain, called out: "Not I"; and received a withering glare from Chamberlain. The stress on "friends" was considered partisan and divisive, reducing politics at a time of crisis from national level to personal level.

Hoare followed Chamberlain and struggled to cope with many of the questions being fired at him about the air force, at one point failing to realise the difference between the Royal Air Force and the Fleet Air Arm. He sat down at 17:37 and was succeeded by David Lloyd George.

Lloyd George: "the worst strategic position in which this country has ever been placed" 

Lloyd George had been prime minister during the last two years of the First World War. He was now 77, and it was to be his last major contribution to debate in the House in which he had sat for 50 years. There was personal animosity between Lloyd George and Chamberlain. The latter's appeal to friends gave Lloyd George the opportunity for retribution. First, he attacked the conduct of the campaign and began by dismissing Hoare's entire speech in a single sentence:

Lloyd George then began his main attack on the government by focusing on the lack of planning and preparation:

Emphasising the gravity of the situation, he argued that Britain was in the worst position strategically that it had ever been as a result of foreign policy failures, which he began to review from the 1938 Munich agreement onwards. Interrupted at this point, he retorted:

Lloyd George went on to say that British prestige had been greatly impaired, especially in America. Before the events in Norway, he claimed, the Americans had been in no doubt that the Allies would win the war, but now they were saying it would be up to them to defend democracy. After dealing with some interruptions, Lloyd George criticised the rate of re-armament pre-war and to date:

Churchill and Chamberlain intervene in Lloyd George's speech 
Dealing with an intervention at this point, Lloyd George said, in passing, that he did not think that the First Lord was entirely responsible for all the things that happened in Norway. Churchill intervened and said:

 

In answer, Lloyd George said:

Jenkins calls this "a brilliant metaphor" but wonders if it was spontaneous. It produced laughter throughout the House, except on the government front bench where, with one exception, all the faces were stony. A spectator in the gallery, Baba Metcalfe, recorded that the exception was Churchill himself. She recalled him swinging his legs and trying hard not to laugh. When things calmed down, Lloyd George resumed and now turned his fire onto Chamberlain personally:

Chamberlain stood and, leaning over the despatch box, demanded:

Lloyd George: Chamberlain "should sacrifice the seals of office" 
Lloyd George responded to that intervention with a direct call for Chamberlain to resign:

There was silence as Lloyd George sat down and one observer said that all the frustrations of the past eight months had been released. Chamberlain was deeply perturbed and, two days later, told a friend that he had never heard anything like it in Parliament. Churchill was overheard saying to Kingsley Wood that it was going to be "damned difficult" for him (Churchill) doing his summary later on. Jenkins says the speech recalled Lloyd George in his prime. It was his best for many years, and also his last of any real impact.

Other speakers
It was 18:10 when Lloyd George concluded and some four hours later that Churchill began his summary to wind up the government's case ahead of the division. In the interim, several speakers were called to argue both for and against the government. They included long-serving Liberal National George Lambert, Sir Stafford Cripps, Alfred Duff Cooper, George Hicks, George Courthope, Robert Bower, Alfred Edwards, and Henry Brooke. The last of these, Brooke, finished at 21:14 and gave way to A. V. Alexander who wound up for Labour and put forward certain questions that Churchill as First Lord might answer. His final point, however, was to criticise Chamberlain for his appeal to friendship:

Jenkins describes Alexander as someone who tried, despite being completely different in character and personality, to make of himself a "mini-Churchill". On this occasion, he did present Churchill with some awkward questions about Norway but, as with other speakers before him, it was done with genuine respect amidst severe criticism of Chamberlain, Hoare, Simon and Stanley in particular. There was some embarrassment for Churchill in that he was late in returning to the House for Alexander's speech and Chamberlain had to excuse his absence. He arrived just in time for Alexander's questions about Norway.

Churchill winds up for the Government 

Churchill was called to speak at 22:11, the first time in eleven years that he had wound up a debate on behalf of the government. Many members believed that it was the most difficult speech of his career because he had to defend a reverse without damaging his own prestige. It was widely felt that he achieved it because, as Nicolson described it, he said not one word against Chamberlain's government and yet, by means of his manner and his skill as an orator, he created the impression of being nothing to do with them. 

The first part of Churchill's speech was, as he said it would be, about the Norwegian campaign. The second part, concerning the vote of censure which he called a new issue that had been sprung upon the House at five o'clock, he said he would deal with in due course.

Churchill proceeded to defend the conduct of the Norwegian campaign with some robustness, although there were several omissions such as his insistence that Narvik be blocked off with a minefield. He explained that even the successful use of the battleship  at Narvik had put her at risk from many hazards. Had any come to pass, the operation, now hailed as an example of what should have been done elsewhere, would have been condemned as foolhardy:

As for the lack of action at Trondheim, Churchill said it was not because of any perceived danger, but because it was thought unnecessary. He reminded the House that the campaign continued in northern Norway, at Narvik in particular but he would not be drawn into giving any predictions about it. Instead, he attacked the government's critics by deploring what he called a cataract of unworthy suggestions and actual falsehoods during the last few days: 

Churchill then had to deal with interruptions and an intervention by Arthur Greenwood who wanted to know if the war cabinet had delayed action at Trondheim. Churchill denied that and advised Greenwood to dismiss such delusions. Soon afterwards, he reacted to a comment by Labour MP Manny Shinwell:

This produced a general uproar led by the veteran Scottish Labour member Neil Maclean, said to be the worse for drink, who demanded withdrawal of the word "skulks". The Speaker would not rule on the matter and Churchill defiantly refused to withdraw the comment, adding that:

Having defended the conduct of the naval operations in the Norwegian campaign at some length, Churchill now said little about the proposed vote, other than to complain about such short notice:

He concluded by saying:

Churchill sat down but the rowdiness continued with catcalls from both sides of the House and Chips Channon later wrote that it was "like bedlam". Labour's Hugh Dalton wrote that a good deal of riot developed, some of it rather stupid, towards the end of the speech.

Division
At 23:00, the Speaker rose to put the question "that this House do now adjourn". There was minimal dissent and he announced the division, calling for the Lobby to be cleared. The division was in effect a no confidence motion or, as Churchill called it in his closing speech, a vote of censure. Of the total 615 members, it has been estimated that more than 550 were present when the division was called but only 481 voted. 

The government's notional majority was 213, but 41 members who normally supported the government voted with the Opposition while an estimated 60 other Conservatives deliberately abstained. The government still won the vote by 281 to 200, but their majority was reduced to 81. Jenkins says that would have been perfectly sustainable in most circumstances, but not when Britain was losing the war and it was clear that unity and leadership were so obviously lacking. In these circumstances, the reversal was devastating and Chamberlain left the chamber pale and grim.

Among the Conservatives, Chips Channon and other Chamberlain supporters shouted "Quislings" and "Rats" at the rebels, who replied with taunts of "Yes-men". Labour's Josiah Wedgwood led the singing of "Rule Britannia", joined by Conservative rebel Harold Macmillan of the Noes; that gave way to cries of "Go!" as Chamberlain left the Chamber. Amery, Keyes, Macmillan and Boothby were among the rebels voting with Labour. Others were Nancy Astor, John Profumo, Quintin Hogg, Leslie Hore-Belisha and Edward Spears, but not some expected dissidents such as Duncan Sandys, who abstained, and Brendan Bracken who, in Jenkins' words, "followed [Churchill's] example rather than his interest and voted with the government". Colville in his diary said the government were "fairly satisfied" but acknowledged that reconstruction of the Cabinet was necessary. He wrote that "the shock they have received may be a healthy one".

9 May: third day and conclusion 
The debate continued into a third day but, with the division having been held at the end of the second day, the final day was really a matter of wrapping up. Starting at 15:18, there were only four speakers and the last of them was Lloyd George who spoke mostly about his own time as prime minister in the First World War and at the 1919 Paris Peace Conference. He concluded by blaming the democracies for not carrying out the pledges made at that time with the result that Nazism had arisen in Germany. When he finished, shortly before 16:00, the question "that this House do now adjourn" was raised and agreed to, thus concluding the Norway Debate.

Aftermath

On 9 and 10 May, Chamberlain attempted to form a coalition government with Labour and Liberal participation. They indicated an unwillingness to serve under him but said they probably would join the government if another Conservative became prime minister. When Germany began its western offensive on the morning of the 10th, Chamberlain seriously considered staying on but, after receiving final confirmation from Labour that they required his resignation, he decided to stand down and advised the King to send for Churchill as his successor.

Gaining the support of both Labour and the Liberals, Churchill formed a coalition government. His war cabinet at first consisted of himself, Attlee, Greenwood, Chamberlain and Halifax. The coalition lasted until the defeat of Nazi Germany in May 1945. On 23 May 1945, Labour left the coalition to begin their general election campaign and Churchill resigned as prime minister. The King asked him to form a new government, known as the Churchill caretaker ministry, until the election was held in July. Churchill agreed and his new ministry, essentially a Conservative one, held office for the next two months until it was replaced by the first Attlee ministry after Labour's election victory.

Place in parliamentary culture 
The Norway debate is regarded as a high point in British parliamentary history, coming as it did at a time when Great Britain faced its gravest-ever danger. Former prime minister David Lloyd George said the debate was the most momentous in the history of Parliament. Future prime minister Harold Macmillan believed that the debate changed British history and, perhaps, world history. 

In his biography of Churchill, Roy Jenkins describes the debate as "by a clear head both the most dramatic and the most far-reaching in its consequences of any parliamentary debate of the twentieth century". He compares it with "its nineteenth-century rivals" (e.g., the Don Pacifico debate of 1850) and concludes that "even more followed from the 1940 debate" as it transformed the history of the next five years.

Andrew Marr wrote that the debate was "one of the greatest parliamentary moments ever and little about it was inevitable". The plotters against Chamberlain succeeded despite being deprived of their natural leader, since Churchill was in the cabinet and obliged to defend it. Marr notes the irony of Amery's closing words which were originally directed against Parliament by Cromwell, who was speaking for military dictatorship.

When asked to choose the most historic and memorable speech for a volume commemorating the centenary of Hansard as an official report of the House of Commons, former Speaker Betty Boothroyd chose Amery's speech in the debate: "Amery, by elevating patriotism above party, showed the backbencher's power to help change the course of history".

Explanatory notes

Citations

General and cited references

Further reading
 Kelly, Bernard (2009). "Drifting Towards War: The British Chiefs of Staff, the USSR and the Winter War, November 1939 – March 1940", Contemporary British History, (2009) 23:3 pp. 267–291, 
 Redihan, Erin (2013). "Neville Chamberlain and Norway: The Trouble with 'A Man of Peace' in a Time of War". New England Journal of History (2013) 69#1/2 pp. 1–18.

External links 
 
 Churchill & The Norway Debate – UK Parliament Living Heritage

1940 in politics
1940 in the United Kingdom
Clement Attlee
Neville Chamberlain
Winston Churchill
Debates in the House of Commons of the United Kingdom
House of Commons of the United Kingdom
May 1940 events
Norwegian campaign
United Kingdom in World War II